Los Ingobernables (Spanish for "The Ungovernables") is a lucha libre (Mexican professional wrestling) stable based in the Consejo Mundial de Lucha Libre (CMLL) promotion. It was formed in April 2014 by La Máscara, Rush and La Sombra, and has since become renowned as one of the top antagonistic groups in CMLL history. As members of the group, La Máscara has held the CMLL World Light Heavyweight Championship and the CMLL World Tag Team Championship alongside Rush, while La Sombra has held the NWA World Historic Middleweight and Welterweight Championships. Through CMLL's working relationship with New Japan Pro-Wrestling (NJPW), Tetsuya Naito joined the stable in 2015, eventually forming an offshoot group named Los Ingobernables de Japón in the Japanese promotion.

On September 27, 2019, founding member Rush and his father La Bestia del Ring announced their departures from CMLL. On December 14, Rush announced that he would be forming a new group, La Facción Ingobernable (Spanish for "The Ungovernable Faction"), in Lucha Libre AAA Worldwide (AAA) and Ring of Honor (ROH).

On March 24, 2021, CMLL announced the re-establishment of the group, dubbed Los Nuevos Ingobernables (Spanish for "The New Ungovernables"), which will be led by El Terrible.

History

Los Ingobernables
Throughout his career in Consejo Mundial de Lucha Libre (CMLL), Rush had been presented as a técnico or a "hero" character, but who had also occasionally showed villainous rudo tendencies during his matches. In mid-2013, this part of Rush's storyline was once again brought to the forefront as the crowd reaction to him grew more and more negative, leading to him eventually being dubbed "the most hated wrestler in CMLL", despite still officially being a técnico. Rush then formed a partnership with La Máscara, with whom he went on to win the Mexican National Trios Championship and the CMLL World Tag Team Championship. Rush then started storyline rivalries with Negro Casas and Shocker, as part of which Rush, La Máscara and Titán lost the Mexican National Trios Championship to Casas' La Peste Negra stable. Meanwhile, longtime técnico La Sombra also began experiencing negative fan reactions due to his rival Volador Jr.'s recent turn to the técnico side. The two storylines came together on April 25, 2014, when Rush, La Máscara and La Sombra first attacked Volador Jr. and then the trio of Casas, Shocker and Mr. Niebla. Though the three effectively became rudos, with CMLL dubbing Rush and La Sombra in particular as the two most hated men in the promotion's recent history, they refused to acknowledge themselves as such, instead calling themselves "técnicos diferentes". The trio was originally dubbed Los Indeseables ("The Undesirables"), before being renamed Los Ingobernables ("The Ungovernables"). Officially Los Ingobernables had no leader with the members billed as equals, however, CMLL fans perceived Rush as the leader of the group.

Following the official formation of Los Ingobernables, members of the trio continued their rivalries with Casas, Shocker and Volador Jr. On June 6, La Sombra faced Volador Jr. in a double title match, where the former's NWA World Historic Middleweight Championship and the latter's NWA World Historic Welterweight Championship were both on the line. In the end, following outside interference from both La Máscara and Rush, La Sombra was victorious, becoming a double champion. On June 13, Rush and La Máscara lost the CMLL World Tag Team Championship to Casas and Shocker. The rivalries both culminated on August 1 at El Juicio Final, where La Sombra lost the NWA World Historic Welterweight Championship back to Volador Jr., while Rush defeated Casas in a Lucha de Apuestas ("bet match"), forcing him to have his head shaved. In late 2014, Rush began sporadically teaming with his former El Bufete del Amor stablemate Marco Corleone. When Rush broke two bones in his ankle in November, Corleone took his place by La Máscara and La Sombra's side, becoming the fourth member of Los Ingobernables. Corleone remained a member of Los Ingobernables even after Rush's February 2015 return.

While he was touring CMLL in May and June 2015, La Sombra's New Japan Pro-Wrestling (NJPW) tag team partner Tetsuya Naito was made the fifth member of Los Ingobernables. Upon his return to NJPW, Naito formed his own Los Ingobernables offshoot group, named Los Ingobernables de Japón. On September 18, La Sombra was unmasked after losing to Atlantis in a Lucha de Apuestas at the 82nd Anniversary Show. In early November, Rush and La Sombra began having issues with each other, which led to a singles match between the two on November 13, where Rush was victorious. After the match, the two founding members of Los Ingobernables made peace with each other. It later turned out that this was La Sombra's final CMLL match as on November 19 it was announced that he had signed with WWE.

During the February 19 Super Viernes show, Rush, La Máscara and Corleone faced Atlantis, Valiente and Rush and Corleone's former Bufete del Amor partner Máximo Sexy in a six-man tag team match. After failing to get along with his partners throughout the match, Corleone stood up for Máximo as he was being brutalized by Rush and La Máscara, leading the two to turn on him and kick him out of Los Ingobernables. On March 18 at the 2016 Homenaje a Dos Leyendas, Rush defeated Máximo Sexy in a Hair vs. Hair Lucha de Apuestas with help from his real-life father Pierroth, who became the newest member of Los Ingobernables. On April 8, La Máscara defeated Ángel de Oro to win the CMLL World Light Heavyweight Championship. On May 13, the three Los Ingobernables members were defeated by TGR (Rey Bucanero, Shocker and El Terrible) in a six-man tag team match, after which Rush and Pierroth turned on La Máscara and attacked him. After being saved by TGR, La Máscara announced he was quitting Los Ingobernables and challenged Rush to a Lucha de Apuestas. Afterwards, Rush announced Los Ingobernables would continue with him and his father as its only two members. On June 27, after weeks of teasing an alliance between Rush and Rey Escorpión, Escorpión abandoned his Los Revolucionarios del Terror stable and officially joined Los Ingobernables. On September 2, Rush and La Máscara reconciled, after the latter had lost his mask to Rush's real-life brother Dragon Lee. Though it was initially left unclear as to what this meant for Los Ingobernables, La Máscara eventually rejoined the stable, once again becoming its third member, following Rey Escorpión's departure from CMLL. On March 17, 2017, at Homenaje a Dos Leyendas, Pierroth lost his mask to Diamante Azul in a Lucha de Apuestas.

On May 22, CMLL publicly fired La Máscara because of an incident, where his family had destroyed Último Guerrero's car over backstage politics. With CMLL owning the rights to the Los Ingobernables name, La Máscara went on to form his own unofficial version of the stable on the Mexican independent circuit, dubbed Ingober Independientes, with his cousin Máximo, who had been fired alongside him, and former Los Ingobernables member Rey Escorpión. Shortly thereafter, Rush and Pierroth began teasing a new third member of Los Ingobernables. At the same time, the two began being accompanied by a man wearing a La Sombra mask. In September, Rush and Pierroth, with CMLL's blessing, began taking independent bookings with The Crash promotion, where they reunited with former stablemate La Máscara.

On February 23, 2018, El Terrible joined Los Ingobernables. The Universal Championship was the start of a storyline between Los Ingobernables (El Terrible and La Bestia del Ring) and Los Hermanos Chavez (Ángel de Oro and Niebla Roja), as El Terrible cheated to defeat Niebla Roja with the held of La Bestia. After several matches between the two sides, they all signed a contract for a Luchas de Apuestas match as the main event of CMLL's 2019 Homenaje a Dos Leyendas event. On March 15, 2019 Los Hermanos Chavez defeated Los Ingobernables two falls to one, forcing both El Terrible and La Besia del Ring to have all their hair shaved off.

On September 27, Rush and La Bestia del Ring announced their departures from CMLL, effectively putting and end to the original stable.

La Facción Ingobernable
On October 31, 2019, Rush and La Bestia would appear in Nación Lucha Libre, reuniting with former stablemate La Máscara. The trio dubbed themselves La Facción Ingobernable (often abbreviated as LFI - based on the Los Ingobernables name from Consejo Mundial de Lucha Libre). On December 14 at AAA's Guerra de Titanes, Rush El Toro Blanco teamed with Blue Demon Jr. and Rey Escorpión to defeat Psycho Clown, Dr. Wagner Jr., and Drago. After the match, it was announced that Rush, La Bestia del Ring, Killer Kross, L.A. Park and Konnan were forming a new version of LFI. The following day on December 15 at ROH's Final Battle Fallout, Rush introduced the American branch of LFI, including himself, Dragon Lee, Kenny King and Amy Rose.

Early 2020 saw two members leave the stable. La Máscara left in January, after Nación Lucha Libre closed down. Killer Kross ended up not representing LFI in the ring, and left in February when he accepted a contract with WWE. The AAA branch was further affected by Mexico's handling of the COVID-19 pandemic, so Rush El Toro Blanco and L.A. Park resumed their long-running feud on Twitter over the next couple of months, potentially setting up a hair vs. mask match. However, this was ignored by AAA, and L.A. Park represented the stable at Triplemanía XXVIII. In a match initially scheduled for Rey de Reyes, he partnered El Hijo de L.A. Park and Blue Demon Jr. (as Rush El Toro Blanco and Bestia del Ring were unable to work the event), where they were defeated by Los Psycho Circus (Psycho Clown, Monster Clown and Murder Clown). Post-match, L.A. Park and Blue Demon Jr. brawled with each other, continuing their feud from earlier in the year. Rush also began teasing a new member of the ROH branch, and at Final Battle, this was revealed to be La Bestia del Ring.

On September 4, 2021, it was announced that Dralístico had joined La Facción Ingobernable, alongside his father and his brothers. On October 9, at Héroes Inmortales XIV, Dralístico and Dragon Lee challenged Los Lucha Bros (Fénix and Pentagón Jr.) for the AAA World Tag Team Championship, after they had retained the title over Jinetes del Aire (Hijo del Vikingo and Laredo Kid). On October 27, ROH announced that they would be releasing all talent from their contracts and going on hiatus following their Final Battle event on December 11. This marked the end of the group's ROH branch.

On April 28, 2022, Vangellys joined the group.

Los Nuevos Ingobernables
On March 24, 2021, CMLL announced the formation of a new version of Los Ingobernables, dubbed Los Nuevos Ingobernables, which would see Ángel de Oro and Niebla Roja join El Terrible. As part of the stable, Ángel de Oro won La Copa VIP in 2021 and Ángel de Oro and Niebla Roja won together the CMLL World Tag Team Championship in January 2022.

Reception
In April 2016, Dave Meltzer of the Wrestling Observer Newsletter wrote that the Los Ingobernables concept of having Rush, once a babyface rejected by Arena México crowds, turn heel and "embrace the negative", had made him a "far more effective headliner".

Members

Los Ingobernables

Timeline

Los Ingobernables de Japón

Timeline

La Facción Ingobernable

Timeline

Los Nuevos Ingobernables

Timeline

Championships and accomplishments

Los Ingobernables
Consejo Mundial de Lucha Libre
CMLL World Light Heavyweight Championship (1 time) – La Máscara
CMLL World Tag Team Championship (2 times) – La Máscara and Rush, Rush and El Terrible
NWA World Historic Middleweight Championship (1 time) – La Sombra
NWA World Historic Welterweight Championship (1 time) – La Sombra
 Mexican National Heavyweight Championship (1 time)  – El Terrible
Leyenda Azul (2017) – Rush
Reyes del Aire (2015) – La Sombra
Torneo Nacional de Parejas Increíbles (2018) – Rush and El Terrible

Los Ingobernables de Japón
New Japan Pro-Wrestling
IWGP Heavyweight Championship (3 times) – Tetsuya Naito
IWGP Intercontinental Championship (6 times) – Tetsuya Naito
IWGP Junior Heavyweight Championship (5 times) – Bushi (1), Hiromu Takahashi (4)
IWGP Junior Heavyweight Tag Team Championship (1 time) – Bushi and Takagi
IWGP Tag Team Championship (3 times) – Evil and Sanada (2), Naito and Sanada (1)
IWGP United States Heavyweight Championship (1 time) – Sanada
IWGP World Heavyweight Championship (1 time) – Shingo Takagi
NEVER Openweight Championship (3 times) – Evil (1), Shingo Takagi (2)
NEVER Openweight 6-Man Tag Team Championship (4 times) – Evil, Bushi and Sanada (3), Evil, Bushi and Shingo Takagi (1)

La Facción Ingobernable
Kaoz Lucha Libre
Kaoz Tag Team Championship (1 time) - Lee and Dralístico
Ring of Honor
ROH World Championship (2 times) – Rush
ROH World Tag Team Championship (2 times) – Dragon Lee and Kenny King
ROH World Television Championship (2 times) – Dragon Lee

Los Nuevos Ingobernables
Consejo Mundial de Lucha Libre
CMLL World Tag Team Championship (1 time, current) – Ángel de Oro and Niebla Roja
CMLL World Light Heavyweight Championship (1 time, current) – Niebla Roja
CMLL Mexican National Light Heavyweight Champion (1 time, current) – Ángel de Oro
Copa Junior VIP (2021) – Ángel de Oro

Luchas de Apuestas record

Notes
Both CMLL and NJPW have referred to the members of Los Ingobernables de Japón as being part of Los Ingobernables when teaming with Rush in tag team matches.

See also
Los Ingobernables de Japón
Los Mercenarios
Consejo Mundial de Lucha Libre
Lucha libre

References

External links
Marco Corleone's CMLL profile 
La Máscara's CMLL profile 
Rush's CMLL profile 
La Sombra's CMLL profile 

Consejo Mundial de Lucha Libre teams and stables
Lucha Libre AAA Worldwide teams and stables
Mexican promotions teams and stables
New Japan Pro-Wrestling teams and stables
Ring of Honor teams and stables
All Elite Wrestling teams and stables